Bonginkosi Makume (born 7 November 1995) is a South African soccer player who plays as a defender for South African Premier Division side Maritzburg United.

References

1995 births
Living people
South African soccer players
Association football defenders
Baroka F.C. players
Maritzburg United F.C. players
South African Premier Division players